The 1968 Torneio do Norte was the first edition of a football competition held in Brazil, featuring 9 clubs. In the finals, Remo defeated Piauí 2–1 in the playoff game, after losing the first game 5-1 and winning the second 4–1 to win their first title and earn the right to play in the finals of 1968 Torneio Norte-Nordeste.

Group stage

Group 1

Group 2

Knockout stage

Semi-finals

|}

|}

Finals

|}

Play-off match final

References

Torneio do Norte
1968 in Brazilian football
Torneio do Norte